Rod Laver and John Newcombe were the defending champions but only Newcombe competed that year with Tony Roche. Newcombe and Roche lost in the final 6–4, 6–4 to Ross Case and Geoff Masters.

Seeds

  John Newcombe /  Tony Roche (final)
  Ross Case /  Geoff Masters (champions)
  Jürgen Fassbender /  Hans-Jürgen Pohmann (semifinals)
  Dick Crealy /  Onny Parun (quarterfinals)

Draw

Main draw

References

Doubles